Jiang Weijie (born 17 October 1991) is a Chinese professional Go player.

Jiang became a professional in 2005. He won his first title, the RICOH Xinxiu Cup, in 2008. Jiang ended Gu Li's six-year reign over the Mingren title, defeating Gu in the fifth and final game by resignation.

Promotion record

Career record
2007: 29 wins, 15 losses
2009: 39 wins, 18 losses
2010: 32 wins, 23 losses

Titles and Runners-up

References

1991 births
Living people
Go players from Shanghai